Unijerina is a small hamlet in Krivošije microregion in southwestern Montenegro, located between the villages Crkvice and Knežlaz.

Demographics
According to the 2011 census, the village had 9 inhabitants.

References

Krivošije
Populated places in Kotor Municipality